The After Party is an American comedy film written and directed by Ian Edelman. The film stars Kyle Harvey, Harrison Holzer, Shelley Hennig, Teyana Taylor, Jordan Rock, Amin Joseph, Andy Buckley, and Blair Underwood.

The film was released on August 24, 2018, by Netflix to negative reviews from critics.

Plot 
Aspiring rapper Owen Ellison (Kyle) and his manager/childhood friend Jeff Levine find Rahmel in a bathroom stall and rap to him, hoping for a record deal. The person in the bathroom stall turns out to be not Rahmel but his intern, Bernard. Jeff convinces him to get Rahmel to come to their next show in exchange for producer credit on a future album.

When coming home from high school, Owen runs into Jeff's sister, Alicia, and invites her to his next show. Jeff invites his father to Owen's next show, who tells him he needs to focus more when he gets to Harvard. Owen is talking to his father backstage before the show to calm his nerves when Jeff tells Owen that he wishes his own father would be more supportive.

They meet Bernard, who brought Wiz Khalifa instead of Rahmel. They smoke weed with Wiz before Owen performs onstage. He performs well, but throws up on Wiz and has a seizure. The video of Owen's seizure goes viral and is called “Seezjah Boy”. Believing his chance at success is over, he decides to join the Marines.

After a crazy night out, he rethinks this decision, and finds it in him to chase his dream one last time.

Cast
 Kyle Harvey as Owen Ellison, an aspiring rapper
 Harrison Holzer as Jeff Levine, Owen's best friend and manager
 Shelley Hennig as Alicia Levine, Jeff's older sister and Owen's love interest
 Jamie Choi as Jessica, major record label executive assistant
 Teyana Taylor as Bl'Asia, a stripper who Jeff is attracted to
 Jordan Rock as Bernard, Rahmel's unpaid intern
 Amin Joseph as Leon, Bl'Asia's stalker ex
 Andy Buckley as Mr. Levine, Jeff and Alicia's father
 Blair Underwood as Sergeant Martin Ellison, Owen's father

Several celebrities have cameo appearances, including Dinah Jane, Wiz Khalifa, Charlamagne tha God, French Montana, DJ Khaled, Ski Mask the Slump God, Desiigner, Pusha T, Jadakiss, DMX, Tee Grizzley, Young M.A, A Boogie wit da Hoodie, Eddie Huang.

Production
In September 2017, it was announced that Ian Edelman would write and direct The After Party for Netflix. Kyle Harvey, Harrison Holzer, Shelley Hennig, Teyana Taylor, Jordan Rock, Amin Joseph, Andy Buckley, and Blair Underwood joined the cast of the film.

Principal photography began in September 2017. Filming was scheduled to last six weeks at locations in New York including The Meadows Music & Arts Festival and the Gramercy Theatre.

Release
The film was released on August 24, 2018, for Netflix.

Reception

Critical response 
The After Party received largely negative reviews from critics, and holds a 0% approval rating on Rotten Tomatoes based on 5 critic reviews, with an average rating of 3.90/10

References

External links 
 
 

2010s American films
2010s English-language films
2010s hip hop films
2018 films
2018 comedy films
American comedy films
English-language Netflix original films
Films about music and musicians